Hot Country Songs is a chart that ranks the top-performing country music songs in the United States, published by Billboard magazine.  In 1985, 51 different songs topped the chart, then published under the title Hot Country Singles, in 52 issues of the magazine, based on playlists submitted by country music radio stations and sales reports submitted by stores.  Only "Lost in the Fifties Tonight (In the Still of the Night)" by Ronnie Milsap managed a second week at the top of the chart.

Alabama, one of the most successful bands in country music history, had the highest number of chart-toppers by a single act in 1985, with four: "(There's A) Fire in the Night", "There's No Way", "40 Hour Week (For a Livin')" and "Can't Keep a Good Man Down".  When the group achieved its third number one of the year in August, Billboard regarded it as Alabama's seventeenth consecutive Hot Country number one, breaking the record for consecutive chart-toppers previously held by Sonny James.  Alabama had released a Christmas single in late 1982 which only peaked at number 35, but the magazine disregarded this for the purposes of the band's number one streak, stating "only a Scrooge would count that against them".  The band would eventually extend its streak of consecutive number ones to 21 before its popularity began to wane in the 1990s.  Earl Thomas Conley, Exile, the Judds and the Oak Ridge Boys each had three number ones in 1985.  Additionally Willie Nelson achieved one solo number one, one in collaboration with Ray Charles, and one as a member of the supergroup the Highwaymen, in which he was joined by Johnny Cash, Waylon Jennings and Kris Kristofferson.

Having appeared regularly on the Hot Country chart since 1976, Mel McDaniel achieved his first and only number one in 1985 with "Baby's Got Her Blue Jeans On".  Ray Charles also topped the chart for the only time in 1985.  Although he was far more associated with the soul and rhythm and blues genres during his lengthy career, Charles placed several songs on the country chart during the mid-1980s.  He went all the way to the top spot with the Willie Nelson collaboration "Seven Spanish Angels", taken from the album Friendship, on which Charles duetted with a range of contemporary country singers.  Gary Morris and Sawyer Brown were also first-time chart-toppers in 1985, with "Baby Bye Bye" and "Step That Step" respectively.  "Have Mercy" by The Judds was the final number one of the year.

Chart history

See also
 1985 in music
 List of artists who reached number one on the U.S. country chart

References

1985
1985 record charts
Country